Edward Rannell Reynolds II (born October 18, 1991) is a former American football safety. He played college football at Stanford. His father is the former NFL linebacker and league official of the same name, Ed Reynolds.

College career
In 2012, Reynolds was a third-team All-American by the Associated Press. He also won the Jack Tatum Trophy.

Reynolds entered the 2014 NFL Draft after his junior season.

Professional career

Philadelphia Eagles
Reynolds was drafted by the Philadelphia Eagles in the fifth round, 162nd overall, in the 2014 NFL Draft. He was released on August 30, 2014, but signed with the practice squad the next day.

On September 4, 2015, Reynolds was cut in the last round of preseason cuts and signed to the practice squad on September 6, 2015. He was promoted to the 53-man active roster on November 20, 2015.

On December 13, 2015, in a game against the Buffalo Bills he recorded his first career interception.

On September 3, 2016, Reynolds was released by the Eagles.

Cleveland Browns
On September 5, 2016, Reynolds was signed to the Browns' practice squad. He was signed to the active roster on October 18, 2016.

Reynolds was waived/injured by the Browns on August 29, 2017 and placed on injured reserve. Reynolds was released by the Browns on September 4, 2017.

Atlanta Legends
In 2019, Reynolds joined the Atlanta Legends of the Alliance of American Football. The league ceased operations in April 2019.

Houston Roughnecks
Reynolds was drafted in the 6th round during phase four in the 2020 XFL Draft by the Houston Roughnecks. He was waived by January 5, 2020.

References

External links
Stanford Cardinal bio

1991 births
Living people
People from Orange Park, Florida
Players of American football from Florida
American football safeties
Stanford Cardinal football players
Philadelphia Eagles players
Woodberry Forest School alumni
Cleveland Browns players
Atlanta Legends players
Houston Roughnecks players